Dlebta (also spelled Delebteh) is a village and municipality located in the Keserwan District of the  Keserwan-Jbeil Governorate in Lebanon. It has an average elevation of 670 meters above sea level and a total land area of 323 hectares. 
Dlebta's inhabitants are Maronite Catholics and other Christians.

References

Populated places in Keserwan District
Maronite Christian communities in Lebanon